30 Trips Around the Sun: The Definitive Live Story 1965–1995 is a four-CD live album by the rock band the Grateful Dead.  It contains 30 songs recorded in concert—one from each of the years 1966 through 1995—plus one song recorded in a 1965 studio session. All of the tracks are selected from the 80-CD box set 30 Trips Around the Sun, which contains 30 previously unreleased complete shows. The album was released on September 18, 2015. A chronological sampling format was also used for the 5-disc set So Many Roads (1965–1995).

Production
Speaking about the selection of concerts for the box set from which the Definitive Live Story tracks were excerpted, producer and tape archivist David Lemieux said, "Our first criterion was the very best live music to represent any given year in the band's history. We wanted to make sure that there were not only the tent-pole shows that fans have been demanding for decades but also ones that are slightly more under the radar, but equally excellent."

Critical reception

On AllMusic, Stephen Thomas Erlewine wrote, "Most of all, 30 Trips illustrates how the Dead kept circling back to their folk and blues beginnings no matter who supplemented the core quintet of Jerry Garcia, Bob Weir, Phil Lesh, Bill Kreutzmann, and Mickey Hart. While the four or five main keyboardists brought their own signatures (particularly Pigpen, whose rough-hewn growl provided a gritty counterpart to the band's spacy early explorations), come 1971, the year after the twin masterpieces of Workingman's Dead and American Beauty, the Dead maintained a groove more psychedelic in spirit than sound.... If you take all 30 trips, the Dead's journey feels long and sweet and unlike anything else in rock."

Track listing
Disc one

Notes

Disc two

Disc three

Disc four

Personnel
Grateful Dead
Jerry Garcia – guitar, vocals
Bob Weir – guitar, vocals
Ron "Pigpen" McKernan – organ, harmonica, percussion, vocals
Bill Kreutzmann – drums
Phil Lesh – bass, vocals
Mickey Hart – drums
Tom Constanten – keyboards
Keith Godchaux – keyboards
Donna Jean Godchaux – vocals
Brent Mydland – keyboards, vocals
Vince Welnick – keyboards, vocals
Additional musicians
Bruce Hornsby – piano, vocals
Branford Marsalis – saxophone
Production
Produced by Grateful Dead
Produced for release by David Lemieux, Doran Tyson, Mark Pinkus
Associate producer: Ivette Ramos
Mixing for 1967 and 1989 shows: Jeffrey Norman
CD mastering: Jeffrey Norman, David Glasser
Tape to digital transfers, wow and flutter correction: John K. Chester, Jamie Howarth
Design, artwork: Steve Vance
Art direction: Doran Tyson, Steve Vance
Photos: Herb Greene, Mary Anne Mayer, Susana Millman, Bob Minkin, Paul Ryan
Package supervision: Kate Dear
Tape research: Michael Wesley Johnson
Liner notes: Jesse Jarnow

Charts

References

Grateful Dead live albums
Rhino Records live albums
2015 live albums